Stephen Parkinson (1 August 1823  – 2 January 1889) was a British mathematician.

Born in Keighley, West Yorkshire, Parkinson went up to St John's College, Cambridge, as a sizar in 1841 and graduated as Senior Wrangler in 1845, beating William Thomson (later to become Lord Kelvin).  He was elected to a Fellowship at St John's in the same year. He was ordained in 1851, made BD in 1855 and DD in 1869.

He was College lecturer in mathematics, tutor and President (1865–89). He was made a Fellow of the Royal Society in 1870.

Parkinson was the author of two mathematical textbooks, Elementary Treatise on Mechanics (1855) and A Treatise on Optics (1859).

References

 Papers of Stephen Parkinson
 Proceedings of the Royal Society 45 (1888–89) pp.i-iii.

1823 births
1889 deaths
Alumni of St John's College, Cambridge
Fellows of St John's College, Cambridge
Fellows of the Royal Society
Senior Wranglers